Cyprian Kikuni Bamwoze was the inaugural Bishop of Busoga in Uganda. 

Bamwoze was educated at the Uganda Christian University. He was ordained  in 1964. He served in the Diocese of Namirembe until 1972 and his appointment as bishop. 

He died on 11 February 2019.

References

20th-century Anglican bishops in Uganda
Uganda Christian University alumni
Anglican bishops of Busoga